UC Baseball Stadium (formerly UC Ballpark and Marge Schott Stadium) is a baseball stadium in Cincinnati, Ohio, on the campus of the University of Cincinnati. It is the home field of the Cincinnati Bearcats.  The stadium holds 3,085 people and opened in 2004. The stadium was named after late Cincinnati Reds owner Marge Schott from 2006 to 2020, when her name was taken off due to renewed controversy over her racist remarks.

Name 
In 2006, the stadium was renamed to Marge Schott Stadium, after former Cincinnati Reds owner Marge Schott, two years after her Marge and Charles J. Schott Foundation donated $ to the university's athletic department for the Richard E. Lindner Varsity Village.

At one point, the university expressed interest in renaming the stadium to "Kevin Youkilis Field at Marge Schott Stadium", after former Bearcat and major leaguer Kevin Youkilis. However, Youkilis, who is Jewish, declined to be associated with Schott, who was known for racist and anti-Semitic statements. Youkilis recalled his father saying to him: "Kevin that is a tremendous honor that they would think of doing this. The only problem is that our family name will never coexist with that other individual. I will never let our family name be next to someone that was filled with such hatred of our Jewish community." In 2020, Bearcats pitcher Nathan Moore along with Youkilis called for the university to remove Schott's name from the stadium.

On June 23, 2020, the university's board of trustees voted unanimously to remove Schott's name from both the stadium and a space in the university's archives library, effective immediately.

Facilities 

The stadium holds 3,085 people and opened in 2004.

In August 2014, TriplePlay HP System turf was installed, replacing the original field turf. All areas of the field, including the warning track, home plate, pitcher's mound, and bullpens are now turf. In 2012, college baseball writer Eric Sorenson ranked the stadium as the third most underrated venue in Division I baseball.

Attendance

Largest baseball attendance (since 2000)

See also
 List of NCAA Division I baseball venues

References

External links
University of Cincinnati Athletics – UC Baseball Stadium
Mounir Lynch (February 28, 2018). "Opinion | Should our baseball stadium be named after Marge Schott?", The News Record.

College baseball venues in the United States
Cincinnati Bearcats baseball
Sports venues in Cincinnati
Baseball venues in Ohio
Sports venues completed in 2004
2004 establishments in Ohio
Name changes due to the George Floyd protests